Bungees are collectible figurines (a scale model representing a human, monster or other creature) that are produced by Magic Box Int., which also created Gogo's Crazy Bones, and published by Jazwares Inc. Each figurine comes with a collectible card as well as disks which earn a player a certain number of points when they land a Bungee on it.

Description
Bungees are small figurines that are made of a rubbery plastic substance and have magnets on their bottoms. The magnets help them to stick to the metal disks and cards they come with, as well as the game boards that the starter packs come with.

History
The Bungees line was launched in the United Kingdom by Esdevium Games in January 2012; it was later expanded to Europe and worldwide. There are 96 Bungees and 48 cards in this series . In September 2012, an additional series called Bionic Bungees was released in the UK. It includes 96 Bungees and 96 stickers.

In February 2014, the American toy company Jazwares announced that Bungees would be released in United States later that year.

References

External links
 Bungees World

2010s toys
Collectible-based games